Regional West Airport, previously named Coronel Adalberto Mendes da Silva Airport  is the airport serving Cascavel, Brazil.

It is operated by Transitar, the semi-independent transportation authority of Cascavel, indirectly related to the Municipality of Cascavel, and under the supervision of Aeroportos do Paraná (SEIL).

History
The airport was commissioned on November 12, 1977.

Since 29 January 2013 the airport is operating with a 1.780m x 45m runway. The enlargement from its previous 1.615m x 30m to the present size was necessary due to the constant increase in the airport's traffic.

Ongoing projects at the airport are the installation of the Precision approach path indicator as well as a new improved fire station, which will raise the safety category to CAT 5.

A new passenger terminal with 6.018,38 m² opened in 2020.

As of the beginning of 2023, the official name of the airport was changed from Coronel Adalberto Mendes da Silva Airport to Regional West Airport.

Airlines and destinations

Access

See also

List of airports in Brazil

References

External links

Airports in Paraná (state)
Airports established in 1977
Cascavel